New England Newspapers Inc is a newspaper publisher based in Pittsfield, Massachusetts. It publishes the Berkshire Eagle.

In 2016, New England Newspapers Inc. was purchased from Digital First Media by a group of Berkshire-based investors.

References

External links
New England Newspapers

Newspaper companies of the United States
Companies based in Massachusetts